The Satellite Data System (SDS) is a system of United States military communications satellites.  At least three generations have been used: SDS-1 from 1976 to 1987; SDS-2 from 1989 to 1996; SDS-3 from 1998 to the present. It is believed that these satellites were known by the code name Quasar. The first generation was named simply 'SDS', the second generation was named 'Quasar' and the third generation each had their own designations.

Orbital characteristics 
SDS satellites have a highly elliptical orbit, going from about 300 kilometers at perigee to roughly 39,000 km at apogee in order to allow communications with polar stations that cannot contact geosynchronous satellites. The high apogee meant that the polar regions were visible for long amounts of time, and only two satellites were required in order to achieve constant communications ability. In addition, two geostationary satellites appear to be part of the system. The SDS satellites were constructed by Hughes Aircraft Company.

Mission 
The primary purpose of the SDS satellites is to relay imagery from low-flying reconnaissance satellites, notably the Keyhole optical reconnaissance and Lacrosse/Onyx radar reconnaissance satellites to ground stations in the United States.

SDS-1 

Each SDS-1 satellite had 12 channels available for Ultra high frequency (UHF) communication. The SDS-1 satellites had similar orbits to the Air Force's Jumpseat ELINT satellites.

It has been speculated that the early satellites served as data relays for the first KH-11 Kennen reconnaissance satellites.

SDS-2 
The solar arrays generate 1238 watts of power. It is believed that the Space Shuttle has been used to launch several satellites, possibly on missions STS-28, STS-38, and STS-53. Other launches have used the Titan IV launch vehicle.

SDS-3

Satellites

References 

 Vick, Berman, Lindborg, Fellow (March 19, 1997) SDS-1 Military Communications Satellite  Federation of American Scientists  Accessed April 24, 2004
 Vick, Berman, Lindborg, Fellow, Pike, Aftergood (March 19, 1997) SDS-2 Military Communications Satellite  Federation of American Scientists  Accessed April 24, 2004

Communications satellites
Hughes Aircraft Company
Military satellites